Louis François Gaston Marie Auguste de Roquemaurel, was a French Navy Officer and explorer, born on 27 September 1804 in Toulouse and died on 1 April 1878 in Toulouse.

Nephew, by his mother, of Jean-Pierre Marcassus de Puymaurin, he took care of his education after the death of his father. Gaston Roquemaurel was a student at the college of Auch and Toulouse at the Royal College, where he prepared for the entrance examination at the École Polytechnique. Received in 1823, it is the same promotion, among others, that the economist Michel Chevalier received. He left school in 1825 and entered into a naval officer career.

He sailed a long time in the Mediterranean, and was promoted to Lieutenant in 1834, which he obtained through the Captain Jacquinot, under the command of which he served during the expedition of Algiers (1830) and boarded for the second expedition of Dumont d'Urville around the world and in Antarctica. Roquemaurel became the second commander of the Dumont d'Urville expedition on board the Astrolabe and kept the expedition logbook, which lasted from 7 September 1837 to 6 November 1840.

Museum of Toulouse 
He then retired to Toulouse, where he entered the Academy of Floral Games. During his travels, Roquemaurel had an important library collection and ethnographic collection bequeathed to the city of Toulouse. In 1882 donations from Roquemaurel were transported and presented in the new Museum of Ancient and Exotic Decorative Art (Musée Saint-Raymond) and then transferred to the Museum in 1922. It is also the source of exotic malacology collections of that museum. In 1950 the space at the Asian and Pacific ethnography collection was named the "Roquemaurel Gallery". Roquemaurel was the original basis of rich ethnographic collection of the Natural History Museum of Toulouse.

Ethnology

Art of Fiji

Art of Salomons

Malacology and Mineralogy

Sources 
 Stéphanie Leclerc-Caffarel, Jean-Philippe Zanco "A disillusioned explorer : Gaston de Rocquemaurel or the culture of the French Naval Scholars during the first part of the 19th century", Terrae Incognitae vol. 45 Issue 2, Oct. 2013.

1804 births
1878 deaths
French explorers
French Navy officers
Military personnel from Toulouse